Walk-in centres may refer to:
 Urgent care center, USA
 Urgent treatment centre, UK
 Walk-in clinic, USA